The Decree On the Development of Digital Economy — the decree of Alexander Lukashenko, the President of the Republic of Belarus, which includes measures to liberalize the conditions for conducting business in the sphere of high technologies. The project was initiated by a Belarusian entrepreneur Viktor Prokopenya and then was developed by the Belarus High Technologies Park and representatives of the Belarusian IT market. The main author of the decree is called a Belarusian lawyer Denis Aleinikov, who developed a legal framework for smart contracts. The decree was signed on December 21, 2017. As a result of the Decree introduction, Belarus has not only adopted the widespread institutions of UK law like convertible bonds, non-compete agreements, but also has become the first country in the world to legalize smart contracts.

History 
In early 2017, the Belarusian IT community actively discussed prospects for the development of the industry and the possibility of supporting technology companies through the Belarus High-Tech Park. Critics acknowledged the institution’s contribution, but noted that the existing model of work created the conditions for the growth of custom software development and IT outsourcing, but did not help companies that create their own software products. According to market participants, work for foreign companies did not create the prospect of rapid growth, and there was not enough system and a legal framework of venture financing for the development of Belarusian start-ups.  

Alongside the discussions in the professional community, in January 2017, at a closed meeting in the Administration of the President of the Republic of Belarus, a decision was taken to develop a new plan for the development of the IT industry, including new measures to support Belarusian IT companies and the introduction of information technology at state companies. Work on the plan was put in charge of Vsevolod Yanchevsky, the President assistant, well-known for his liberal views, the head of the main ideological department of the presidential administration and the curator of the direction of ensuring state policy in the spheres of information and high technologies.

Resignation of an irreplaceable head of the Belarus High Technologies Park Valery Tsepkalo on March 2, 2017 was unexpected for the industry. Representatives of the IT industry and journalists made an assumption that the resignation could be related to the failure to achieve a number of stated goals and targets in 2016 as well as Tsepkalo’s conservative and passive approach to the development of the park. On March 13, Alexander Lukashenko visited IT companies in Belarus - Banuba Development and EXP Capital, whose net income per employee is 5.6 and 4.3 times bigger respectively than other residents of the High-Tech Park in 2016. The President discussed with the technological entrepreneurs and investors Viktor Prokopenya and Mikhail Gutseriyev the idea of creating an IT Development Council that would unite representatives of relevant departments, businessmen and investors in the sphere of high technologies. On March 15, the President of Belarus appointed Vsevolod Yanchevsky as the new head of the High-Tech Park. A month later, on April 21, in his annual address to the parliament and the Belarusian people, Alexander Lukashenko instructed to develop a new decree on the High-Tech Park, which would attract international companies engaged in the most promising areas — driverless transport, artificial intelligence, digital currencies.

To develop a new decree, the administration of the High-Tech Park attracted representatives of the IT industry and expert community, held dozens of meetings with technology companies, as well as Belarusian and international legal and consulting firms, including Aleinikov & Partners, Vlasova, Mikhel & Partners, Baker Tilly Bel and others. The main author of the decree is called a Belarusian lawyer Denis Aleinikov, who developed a legal framework for smart contracts and proposed to implement institutions of “English law” to boost venture capital financing in Belarus. 

The concept of a decree named in the IT community "Decree on the High-Tech Park 2.0" was published for the first time in a number of sources in July 2017 and was widely discussed by market participants and economists during the summer. In September, the draft was submitted to Alexander Lukashenko as a part of a package of liberal reforms of business legislation. During the discussion of Decree 2.0, the president suggested rethinking the title of the document, as its provisions affected not only the High-Tech Park, but also the Belarusian economy at large. By the beginning of December, a document called the "Decree on the Development of Digital Economy" had been approved by all authorized public authorities and again submitted to the president. On December 11, 2017, Alexander Lukashenko held a meeting on the draft of the decree with the government officials and well-known representatives of the IT community and announced that he planned to sign the document by the end of 2017. The decree was signed by the president on December 21.

In 2018, almost 200 companies became HTP residents. This is two times more than in the entire history of the Park. In 2006, 15 residents registered in the Park; as of November 2017, their number was 192. As of November 2018, 388 companies were residents of the Park. The export of IT in the first half of 2018 increased by more than 40% compared with the same period last year.

Key points 
The provisions of the decree "On the Development of Digital Economy" create of a legal basis for the circulation of digital currencies and tokens based on blockchain technology, so that resident companies of the High-Tech Park can provide the services of stock markets and exchange offices with cryptocurrencies and attract financing through the ICO. For legal entities, the Decree confers the rights to create and place their own tokens, carry out transactions through stock markets and exchange operators; to individuals the Decree gives the right to engage in mining, to own tokens, to acquire and change them for rubels, foreign currency and electronic money, and to bequeath them. Up to 1 Jan In 2023, the Decree excludes revenue and profits from operations with tokens from the taxable base. In relation to individuals, the acquisition and sale of tokens is not considered entrepreneurial activity, and the tokens themselves and income from transactions with them are not subject to declaration. The peculiarity of the introduced regulation is that all operations will have to be carried out through the resident companies of the High Technology Park.

In addition, the decree includes:
 Extension of the validity period of the special legal regime of the High-Tech Park until January 1, 2049, and expansion of the list of activities of resident companies. Under the new rules, developers of blockchain-based solutions, developers of machine learning systems based on artificial neural networks, companies from the medical and biotechnological industries, developers of unmanned vehicles, as well as software developers and publishers can become residents. The list of promising areas is unlimited and can be expanded by the decision of the High-Tech Park supervisory board.
 Preservation of existing benefits for resident companies in the High-Tech Park, including the cancellation of the profit tax (instead of which a contribution of 1% of the gross revenues proceeding to the administration of the park is applied), reduced to 9% of the personal income tax rate for employees, and the right to contribute to the Social Protection Fund according to the national average figures, and not the actual salaries.
 Exemption of foreign companies providing marketing, advertising, consulting and other services to the residents of the High-Tech Park from paying value-added tax, as well as paying income tax, which allows to promote IT products of Belarusian companies in foreign markets. To encourage investments, the Decree also exempts foreign companies from the tax on income from the alienation of shares, stakes in the authorized capital and shares in the property of residents of the High-Tech Park (under condition of continuous possession of at least 365 days).
 Introduction of individual English law institutions for residents of the High-Tech Park, which will make it possible to conclude option contracts, convertible loan agreements, non-competition agreements with employees, agreements with responsibility for enticing employees, irrevocable powers of attorney and other documents common in international practice. This measure is aimed at simplifying the structuring of transactions with foreign capital.
 Simplification of the regime of currency transactions for residents of the High-Tech Park, including the introduction of a notification procedure for currency transactions, the cancellation of the mandatory written form of foreign trade transactions, the introduction of confirmation of the conducted operations by primary documents drawn up unilaterally. Also, the decree removes restrictions on resident companies for transactions with electronic money and allows opening accounts in foreign banks and credit and financial organizations without obtaining permission from the National Bank of the Republic of Belarus.
 Simplification of the procedure for recruiting qualified foreign specialists by resident companies of the High-Tech Park, including the abolition of the recruitment permit, the simplified procedure for obtaining a work permit, and the visa-free regime for the founders and employees of resident companies with a term of continuous stay of up to 180 days.

Discussion 

The publication of the key points of the “Decree 2.0” in June 2017 was warmly on that momentreceived by the participants of the IT industry, but faced criticism from one of Belarusian economists. A noteworthy episode was the remote debate of Sergei Chaly, an economist and on that moment the host of the TV show "Economics in lay terms", and Nikolay Markovnik, general manager of the investment company VP Capital Belarus, which belongs to Viktor Prokopenya. Chaly expressed his point of view in the release of his own program and an interview to the European Radio for Belarus, and Markovnik – in columns on the Internet sources Dev.by, KYKY.ORG and TUT.BY.

According to the economist, the authors of the decree draft should focus on the overall development of civil law reform, the beneficial effect of which would affect all sectors of the economy. Markovnik answered to Chaly that the reform should start in a testbox which would be used later for overall reform, so the authors of the Decree focused on the IT-sphere they understand and on the obstacles to its growth.

Chaly supposed that the tax preferences created by the Decree for the IT market within the High-Tech Park will be provided at the expense of taxes from other branches of the Belarusian economy. According to Markovnik, reducing the bureaucratic burden on the IT companies in the future will serve as a precedent for changes in other sectors of the economy (as it happened earlier with the introduction of a flat scale of income tax and contributions to the Social Protection Fund, first implemented in the High Technology Park in 2005, and then everywhere in 2009) and they are building Communism in IT sector.

Chaly supposed that the activities of the resident companies of the park are not very promising given their record, since the IT startup market is controlled by large international corporations. Markovnik pointed out that the orientation of Belarusian IT companies to foreign markets means that the support of their work can only harm their foreign competitors, and the Belarusian economy will only benefit from increased tax revenues of IT companies.

According to the economist, unmanned cars are not introduced into Belarus and have no demand for their current price, crypto-currencies could be risky economic bubbles, and the technology of the blockchain is technical not legal, and is only applicable to the operation of cryptocurrencies. Markovnik, being himself a lawyer, also blamed the opponent for not understanding modern technologies (unmanned cars, blockchain technology), claimed that the best world education is now offered at Coursera and Khanacademy, and noted that the expanded list of the directions of work at the High-Tech Park was drawn up taking into account the main trends, and the Decree creates the legal basis necessary for the development of breakthrough technologies.

One of the developers of the document, attorney Denis Aleinikov noted that as a result of the Decree introduction, Belarus has not only adopted the widespread institutions of UK law like convertible bonds, non-compete agreements, but also has become the first country in the world to legalize smart contracts.

Criticism
Tut.by reported that due to one of the tax benefits of Decree, social security payments are levied from employers and paid to the employees of IT companies calculated not on the basis of their real amounts, which are substantially higher than the average salary, but calculated and paid based on the amount of the country average salary. This leads to low social payments to IT employees for the sick leaves, consequently, IT employees prefer not to take sick leave.

References

Economy of Belarus
Decrees
Alexander Lukashenko